The Canadian Forum was a literary, cultural and political publication and Canada's longest running continually published political magazine (1920–2000).

History and profile
Canadian Forum was founded on 14 May 1920 at the University of Toronto as a forum for political and cultural ideas. Its first directors were G. E. Jackson, chairman, Barker Fairley, literary editor, C. B. Sissons, political editor, Peter Sandiford, business manager and Huntly Gordon, press editor.
Throughout its publishing run it was Canadian nationalist and progressive in outlook.

The magazine was published monthly. As a cultural and literary publication it published the artistic works of the Group of Seven and Frank Carmichael as well as poetry and short stories by Irving Layton, Earle Birney, A. J. M. Smith, Harold Standish, Helen Weinzweig, Margaret Atwood and Al Purdy.

Politically, it was a forum for thinkers such as Frank Underhill, F. R. Scott, Ramsay Cook, Mel Watkins, John Alan Lee, Eugene Forsey and Robert Fulford.

In 1934, publisher Steven Cartwright purchased the periodical from J.M. Dent & Sons. After owning it for about a year, Cartwright unloaded the money-losing venture for one 
dollar to Graham Spry a member of the socially progressive think tank the League for Social Reconstruction (LSR). It was printed using Spy's printing press company, Stafford Printers, which also printed the Ontario CCF's newspaper The New Commonwealth. Spry purchased the press with financial help from both the LSR and English socialist Sir Stafford Cripps, hence the name Stafford Press. in 1936, the LSR bought the Forum for one-dollar from Spry, and assumed all its debts. University of Toronto Classics professor George Grube, a member of the LSR, became the editor in 1937. During his tenure, the periodical was the LSR's official organ. Grube stepped down as editor in 1941, about a year before the LSR officially disbanded. It has also been operated at times as a co-operative and was owned for a number of years by James Lorimer and Co.

Editors have included Mark Farrell, G. M. A. Grube, J. Francis White, Northrop Frye, Milton Wilson, Abraham Rotstein, Denis Smith and the final editor Duncan Cameron.

The magazine suspended publication following its summer 2000 issue.

Notes

References

External links
Archival papers of Gilbert Edward Jackson, Editor (1920–1925), are held at the University of Toronto Archives and Records Management Services

1920 establishments in Ontario
2000 disestablishments in Ontario
Visual arts magazines published in Canada
Monthly magazines published in Canada
Defunct political magazines published in Canada
Defunct literary magazines published in Canada
Magazines established in 1920
Magazines disestablished in 2000
Magazines published in Toronto
University of Toronto